Gastrocopta contracta, common name the bottleneck snaggletooth, is a species of very small air-breathing land snail, a terrestrial pulmonate gastropod mollusk in the family Vertiginidae, the whorl snails.

Distribution 
This species occurs in eastern North America from Mexico to the United States, east of the Rocky Mountains, and in Canada in Manitoba (at Carberry) Canada.

References

Vertiginidae
Gastropods described in 1822